Intercity Bus Terminal or ICBT may refer to:

 Bus terminus
 Inter City Bus Terminal (Hyderabad, India)
 Inter-City Bus Terminal (Reading, Pennsylvania)
 Intercity Bus Terminal Station aka Sangbong station, Seoul